The Junpai A50 is a compact sedan produced by Junpai, a sub-brand of FAW Group.

History 

The vehicle was unveiled at Auto Shanghai in April 2017 and is being sold exclusively in China since April 2018. The Junpai CX65 crossover estate uses the same platform.

The only engine available for the CX65 is a 1.5-litre engine.

References 

A50
Front-wheel-drive vehicles
Compact cars
Sedans
2010s cars
Cars introduced in 2018